Shahmabad (also Romanized as Shāmābād; also known as Shāhamābād, Shāhemābād, and Emāmīyeh) is a village in Bayaz Rural District, in the Central District of Anar County, Kerman Province, Iran. At the 2006 census, its population was 954, in 238 families.

References 

Populated places in Anar County